Pierre Chompré (Narcy, Haute-Marne 1698 – Paris, 18  August 1760), was a French schoolmaster, author of educational books and Latin sermons editor.

Biography 
He held in Paris a thriving pension and composed several educational books for the use of his pupils. His Dictionnaire abrégé de la Fable, published in 1727, was translated into many languages and reprinted many times until the middle of the nineteenth century. "Here we have a man named Chompré, wrote his contemporary Baron Grimm, which possesses for the instruction of youth a very rare and recognized talent. He saw that the most perfect books we have from antiquity repelled young people by their uselessness, obscurities or things beyond their reach in them. He is responsible for the care to extract all that can attract, entertain or educate young people".

His brother, Étienne Marie Chompré, was also a schoolmaster. His son was Nicolas Maurice Chompré.

Main publications 
Dictionnaire abrégé de la fable, pour l'intelligence des poètes, et la connaissance des tableaux et des statues, dont les sujets sont tirés de la fable (1727) Text online
Selecta latini sermonis exemplaria e scriptoribus probatissimis ad christianae juventutis usum collecta (3 volumes, 1749–1753)
Vocabulaire Latin-François contenant les mots de la latinité des différens siècles ... avec un vocabulaire François-Latin (1754)
Introduction à la langue latine par la voie de la traduction (1751)
Dictionnaire abrégé de la Bible pour la connaissance des tableaux historiques tirés de la Bible même et de Josephus (1755)
Moyens sûrs d'apprendre facilement les langues et principalement la latine (1757)
Introduction à l'étude de la langue grecque, ou Feuilles élémentaires (1758)
Traduction des extraits des comédies de Plante et de Térence, contenu dans Cours d'études à l'usage des élèves de l'École royale militaire by Charles Batteux (1778)

References

Sources 
Sources biographiques : Pierre Larousse, Grand Dictionnaire universel du XIXe siècle, vol. IV, 1869.

18th-century French writers
18th-century French male writers
French educational theorists
1698 births
1760 deaths